Albert Leland Walrath (December 14, 1885 – September 21, 1926) was an American football and basketball coach.

He was a 1908 graduate of Hillsdale College in Hillsdale, Michigan. He later served as a professor at his alma mater.

He was the head football coach (1911) and head basketball coach (1911–1914) at Western Illinois University (then known as Western Normal College).

References

External links
 

1885 births
1926 deaths
Basketball coaches from Wisconsin
Hillsdale College alumni
Hillsdale College faculty
Western Illinois Leathernecks football coaches
Western Illinois Leathernecks men's basketball coaches
People from Waupun, Wisconsin
Players of American football from Wisconsin
Sportspeople from the Milwaukee metropolitan area